Weitbrecht is a surname. Notable people with the surname include:

 H. U. Weitbrecht (1851–1937), British Anglican missionary
 Josias Weitbrecht (1702–1747), German professor of medicine and anatomy
 Robert Weitbrecht (1920–1983), American engineer

See also
 Weinbrecht, surname
 Weitbrecht Communications